"Something Blue" is the 22nd and final episode in the second season of the television series How I Met Your Mother. It originally aired on May 14, 2007.

Plot

With Marshall and Lily's wedding reception in full swing, Ted and Robin begin discussing a big announcement, and when Barney overhears, he harasses them until they relent, telling him of what happened 2–3 weeks before the wedding. Ted and Robin say that they have not revealed it before, because of the wedding.

In the restaurant where Ted and Robin had their first date, Ted and Robin receive two complementary glasses of champagne. Robin discovers an engagement ring at the bottom of the glass, and begins to think that Ted is proposing to her. Barney reacts in horror at the thought they might marry, and Ted reveals Robin reacted with similar horror. The proposal was actually meant for a couple at another table; when the mix-up is clarified, the other woman accepts, but Robin's horror and subsequent relief unearths unresolved issues between Ted and her.

The restaurant owner recognizes Ted is the man who stole his blue French horn, Ted runs away, but runs into a waiter, food getting all over Robin and him. The restaurant owner forces Ted to return the blue French horn in order to get his credit card and driver's license back. They go to Robin's apartment, and Robin discusses that she does not want to settle down, and that she has always wanted to travel the world, going to places such as Argentina. Ted also expresses this desire, saying that he wished he had studied abroad for a year while at college and claiming that Argentina also needs architects. Since he just finished a big project at work (the Seattle project), he feels that now is as good a time as ever to travel the world. Barney is again disgusted by this idea, not on the terms of their relationship, but due to concerns of his being lonely in New York and Argentina being economically unstable.

Ted and Robin then discuss the issue of kids. Robin does not want to have kids, but tells Ted that if she was to have anyone's kids, she would have his. Before having sex, they realize that neither of them have a condom and initially decide to hold off, but then decide to take the risk. At this point, a terrified Barney believes that Robin is pregnant with Ted's child. His fears seem confirmed when he sees Robin catching the bouquet and making a point of not drinking.

As Marshall and Lily leave on the honeymoon, Ted and Robin then reveal that after they had sex that night, they realized that their relationship was not heading in a direction either of them wanted to follow, and that they could no longer pretend that these issues did not matter to them. After exactly a year of being together in a relationship, Ted and Robin break up, although they decide to remain on amicable terms. This further stuns Barney, who wondered why he had not heard. Through a flashback to the episode "Showdown", they explain that they decided to hold off announcing the breakup because of Lily and Marshall's impending wedding. As Robin is asked by a little boy for a dance at the wedding reception, Barney tells Ted that even though he had always joked about the two of them breaking up, he thought that they were a good couple. Ted agrees, but says that they were not headed in the same direction. Ted then gets a drink from the bar and a cigar from Barney, and tells an overjoyed Barney that he's going to need a wingman again. Future Ted then reveals that they eventually both got what they wanted out of life; Robin went on to travel the world, while Ted met his future wife. Ted no longer considers Robin to be "The One", and is finally able to move on.

Meanwhile, Marshall and Lily cannot eat at their own wedding reception because of things such as food being taken right out from under them and relatives congratulating them just as they are about to get a bite. Lily also gets drunk, and misses in her attempt to feed Marshall some cake. When they finally get to the limo, which is driven by Ranjit, Marshall asks to stop at a fast-food restaurant so that they can get something to eat. At the restaurant, Marshall begins to fully realize that Lily is his wife, and his realization makes him very happy. The season ends with Ted accepting Barney as his wingman, and Barney declaring the summer is going to be "Legen—wait for it..."

Critical response
In his episode review at TV Squad Joel Keller gave the episode a 7, their highest rating.

Staci Krause of IGN gave the episode 9.3 out of 10.

References

External links
 

How I Met Your Mother (season 2) episodes
2007 American television episodes
Television episodes about weddings